St. Demetrius' Church is a church in Poliçan, Berat County, Albania. It became a Cultural Monument of Albania in 1977.

References

Cultural Monuments of Albania
Buildings and structures in Berat County